"Feel the Beat" (stylized in all caps) is a song recorded by American hip hop group Black Eyed Peas and Colombian singer Maluma for the former's eighth studio album, Translation (2020). It was written by William Adams, Yonatan Goldstein, Allan Pineda, Jimmy Luis Gomez, Maluma, Hugh L Clarke, Paul Anthony Thomas, Curtis T. Bedeau, Gerard R. Charles, Brian P. George and Lucien J. George. The song was produced by Adams under his stage name will.i.am and co-produced by Johnny Goldstein and Mucky. J. Rey Soul provides vocals in the video version of the song, she does not appear on the album version. "Feel the Beat" was released as the third single from the album on June 19, 2020, by Epic Records.

Background
The Black Eyed Peas and Maluma first worked together on the former's 2019 single "Ritmo". Ultimately, Maluma's verse was removed from the song and was replaced by J Balvin. They then collaborated on a second song that "turned out to be another dead end". According to will.i.am, Maluma then became "very critical on everything that we did" and the two eventually came up with "Feel the Beat", which contains the verse that was originally written for "Ritmo".

Music video
The music video for "Feel the Beat" was released on June 19, 2020.

Charts

Release history

See also
List of Billboard Hot Latin Songs and Latin Airplay number ones of 2020

References

2020 songs
2020 singles
Black Eyed Peas songs
Songs written by will.i.am
Songs written by apl.de.ap
Songs written by Taboo (rapper)
Songs written by Maluma (singer)